Maras is a surname. Notable people with the surname include:

 Alen Maras (born 1982), Croatian footballer
 Anthony Maras, Australian filmmaker
 Čedo Maras (born 1959), Yugoslav goalkeeper
 Gordan Maras (born 1974), Croatian politician
 Mate Maras (born 1939), Croatian translator
 Robert Maras (born 1978), German basketball player
 Tommy Maras (born 1967), Australian footballer
 Vlasios Maras (born 1983), Greek gymnast
 Wiesław Maras (born 1950), Polish politician